The Frederick Douglass Book Prize is awarded annually by the Gilder Lehrman Institute of American History and the Gilder Lehrman Center for the Study of Slavery, Resistance, and Abolition at Yale University.

It is a $25,000 award for the most outstanding non-fiction book in English on the subject of slavery, abolition or antislavery movements.

List of recipients
Source: The Gilder Lehrman Center for the Study of Slavery, Resistance, and Abolition

See also

 List of history awards

References

External links
"Frederick Douglass Book Prize Award Dinner", C-SPAN, February 28, 2002
"The Gilder Lehrman Institute of American History"

Awards established in 1999
American history awards
American non-fiction literary awards
Slavery in the United States
Books about race and ethnicity
1999 establishments in New York (state)